Christina Watches–Dana was a Danish professional cycling team based in Herning that competed on the UCI Continental Circuits. The captain of the team was Michael Rasmussen, who won the climbers jersey at the 2005 and 2006 Tour de France, until he ended his career in early 2013.

Christina Watches was owned by the Danish watch designer Christina Hembo, who bought the Danish UCI continental team Stenca–M1 in December 2010.

On 9 October 2014 Cyclingnews.com reported that the team will fold after the 2014 season as the team owners have chosen to sponsor a handball team.  now exists.

Victories

2011
Himmerland Rundt, Michael Reihs
Tallinn–Tartu GP, Angelo Furlan
Stages 1, 4 & 5 Tour de Serbie, Angelo Furlan
Stage 3 Tour de Serbie, Michael Rasmussen

2012
Overall Tour de Serbie, Stefan Schumacher
Stage 3, Stefan Schumacher
Overall Tour of China I, Martin Pedersen
Stage 1 (TTT)
Overall Tour of China II, Stefan Schumacher
Prologue & Stage 4 (ITT), Stefan Schumacher

2013
Stage 1 Tour d'Algérie, Stefan Schumacher
Circuit d'Alger, Martin Pedersen
Overall Tour de Tipaza, Constantino Zaballa
Stage 1, Constantino Zaballa
Stage 3 Tour du Maroc, Morten Høberg
Destination Thy, Constantino Zaballa
Stage 2 Tour of Estonia, Angelo Furlan
Stage 3a (ITT) Sibiu Cycling Tour, Stefan Schumacher

2014
Stage 2 Szlakiem Grodów Piastowskich, Asbjørn Kragh
Stage 3 (ITT) Szlakiem Grodów Piastowskich, Stefan Schumacher
Stage 3 (ITT) Tour de Beauce, Stefan Schumacher

Team roster

References

External links

Cycling teams based in Denmark
UCI Continental Teams (Europe)
Cycling teams established in 2009
Cycling teams disestablished in 2014
Defunct cycling teams based in Denmark